Irish Ghost, English Accent is a 2010 e-book by Irish filmmaker Graham Jones. It's the story of a mother who has a diagnosis of severe paranoid schizophrenia, the daughter she is denied custody of and their mutual decision to go on the run together. Its publication was announced following the success of Jones' earlier novel Traveller Wedding the previous year.

References

External links
Graham Jones Official Website

2010 Irish novels